Valeri Lebedev may refer to:

 Valeri Lebedev (footballer, born 1969), Russian football player
 Valeri Lebedev (footballer, born 1976), Russian football player